Landet is a small town located on the island of Tåsinge in south-central Denmark, in Svendborg Municipality. It is one kilometer west of Lundby, five kilometers south of Vindeby and nine kilometers south of Svendborg.

References 

Cities and towns in the Region of Southern Denmark
Svendborg Municipality